A. M. S. G. Ashokan is an Indian politician and member of the  Tamil Nadu Legislative Assembly representing Sivakasi. He is a member of the Indian National Congress.

Personal life
Ashokan is a commerce graduate and has been a Congress party member since 1996. He served as the vice chairman of the Sivakasi municipality between 2006 and 2011. His father A. M. S. Ganesan also served as the chairperson of the Sivakasi municipality between 1967 and 1974 and his elder brother was the Tamil Nadu state president of the Seva Dal. He is also the managing director of the Arasan Ganesan Group of Industries.

Electoral performance

References

Indian National Congress politicians from Tamil Nadu
Living people
Tamil Nadu MLAs 2021–2026
Year of birth missing (living people)
Tamil Nadu politicians